The 2005 Food City 500 was the 5th race of the 2005 NASCAR Nextel Cup Series season, held on April 3, 2005, at Bristol Motor Speedway in Bristol, Tennessee. Pole position was won by Elliott Sadler of Robert Yates Racing, who had a pole time of 15.022 seconds. Rusty Wallace would lead the most laps of the day with 157. In the end, Kevin Harvick would win.

Background

Qualifying 
Elliott Sadler would win the pole with a 15.022. Meanwhile, Carl Edwards would crash during qualifying after spinning off of Turn 2, causing him to start at the back.

Race recap 
For pre-race ceremonies, Mike Rife from the Vansant Church of Christ would give out the invocation. A moment of silence was held for the death of Pope John Paul II during invocation. Columbia Recordings' artist Buddy Jewell would sing the national anthem. Jerry Kilgore would give out the command to start engines.

Elliott Sadler would jump to the lead on the start. Almost immediately, on the third lap Kasey Kahne would get loose in Turn 2, causing the field to stack up. This would eventually cause a wreck between Jason Leffler and Hermie Sadler, and while they had damage, none of the two would retire. The field would restart on lap 10, but on lap 21 the second caution would come out when Kyle Busch would push up Joe Nemechek into the frontstretch wall, causing him to turn down and hit Casey Mears, which ended Mears' day. On the lap 36 restart, Rusty Wallace would go to the lead. The third caution of the day came out when on lap 50 Stanton Barrett spun going into Turn 1, hitting the Turn 1 wall. Barrett would eventually retire due to oil pressure issues. The restart on lap 54 showed Wallce leading the field again, but the fourth caution would fly when Mike Bliss spun in Turn 1, collecting Kyle Busch. Michael Waltrip would take the lead from pit stops, and lead the field on the lap 75 restart until getting passed by Kevin Harvick on lap 90. Wallace would take over the lead on lap 101, when on lap 136 debris resting in Turn 2 would put out the fifth caution of the day.

On the lap 143 restart, Harvick would jump to the lead in two laps, but on lap 151 Ryan Newman would make contact with Ken Schrader going into Turn 3, cutting a tire down for Newman and causing him to spin.

Results

References 

2005 NASCAR Nextel Cup Series
NASCAR races at Bristol Motor Speedway
August 2005 sports events in the United States
2005 in sports in Tennessee